In statistics, a semiparametric model is a statistical model that has parametric and nonparametric components.

A statistical model is a parameterized family of distributions:  indexed by a parameter .  

 A parametric model is a model in which the indexing parameter  is a vector in -dimensional Euclidean space, for some nonnegative integer .
 With a nonparametric model, the set of possible values of the parameter  is a subset of some space , which is not necessarily finite-dimensional. For example, we might consider the set of all distributions with mean 0.  Such spaces are vector spaces with topological structure, but may not be finite-dimensional as vector spaces.  Thus,  for some possibly infinite-dimensional space .
 With a semiparametric model, the parameter has both a finite-dimensional component and an infinite-dimensional component (often a real-valued function defined on the real line).  Thus, where  is an infinite-dimensional space.

It may appear at first that semiparametric models include nonparametric models, since they have an infinite-dimensional as well as a finite-dimensional component. That is, the infinite-dimensional component is regarded as a nuisance parameter. In nonparametric models, by contrast, the primary interest is in estimating the infinite-dimensional parameter. Thus the estimation task is statistically harder in nonparametric models.

These models often use smoothing or kernels.

Example
A well-known example of a semiparametric model is the Cox proportional hazards model. If we are interested in studying the time  to an event such as death due to cancer or failure of a light bulb, the Cox model specifies the following distribution function for :

Here  is finite-dimensional and is of interest;  is an unknown non-negative function of time (known as the baseline hazard function) and is often a nuisance parameter.

See also
Semiparametric regression
Statistical model
Generalized method of moments

Notes

References

Begun, Janet M.; Hall, W. J.; Huang, Wei-Min; Wellner, Jon A. (1983), "Information and asymptotic efficiency in parametric--nonparametric models", Annals of Statistics, 11 (1983), no. 2, 432--452

 
Mathematical and quantitative methods (economics)